Manasam is a 1997 Indian Malayalam film directed by CS Sudheesh and starring Dileep and Srividya in the lead roles.

Plot
Soloman has lost his parents in a car accident and got mental depression. After recovery, his brother wouldn't take him back. Rajalakshmi leads a lonely life. She adopts Solomon as her Son. Solomon tries to help Rajalakshmi solve several problems that come her way. One day, Maya visits Rajalakshmi's house. She is Menon's granddaughter.  Rajalakshmi reminesces about her childhood, such as when Maya got her childhood face and Soloman got Appu's Face. Appu and Rajalakshmi love each other. Appu is an art culture worker. Rajalakshmi's father hurt him as his father (Kunjiraman) is a worker of Rajalakshmi's father. Sudhakaran is Rajalakshmi's cousin. He want to marry Rajalakshmi. Sudhkaran learn about Appu and Rajalakshmi affair. He beat Kunjiraman to find out Appu. Kunjiraman attempt suicide. Rajalakshmi ready to marry Sudhakaran.  Jayadevan visit Menon to see his mother Rajalakshmi. Rajalakshmi requested Menon don't let Jayadevan to stay in Menon's House. But Menon rejected as Jayadevan is her son . Rajalakshmi learnt that her mother passed away. She informed Menon to take Jayadevan for his Grandmother's funeral. Jayadevan visited Rajalakshmi, but she rejected. She is afraid whether Jayadevan will attack Soloman. Kichamani told to Menon about Soloman and Maya affair. Menon didn't like their relationship. Menon ready to marry Maya with Jayadevan. But Jayadevan told Menon about his blood Cancer. Solomon Visit Maya, but Menon beat him . Jayadevan Supports Soloman. Some goons attack Soloman. Rajalakshmi blamed Jayadevan as he attack Soloman. Menon called Rajalakshmi as Maya is Missing. Menon doubt's Soloman. Soloman learnt that Maya is with Rajamma's house. Menon accept Soloman and Maya relation. Rajalakshmi remember about her past when Appu visited Rajalakshmi. Appu told her he got a job in a town. He is ready to marry Rajalakshmi, but she told she married with Sudhakaran. Sudhakaran sees Appu and killed him. Sudhakaran sentenced to death. Rajalakshmi tried to kill Jayadevan as his father killed Appu. But Jayadevan already died and Rajalakshmi learnt about his blood Cancer and cries. She was admitted to Mental asylum. When Soloman and Maya visit Rajalakshmi, she didn't recognize them.

Cast
Srividya as Rajalakshmi
Dileep as Solomon & Appu (Dual Role)
Kaveri as Maya & Rajalakshmi (Dual Role)
Biju Menon as Jayadevan & Sudhakaran (Dual Role)
Nedumudi Venu as Balakrishnan Menon 
Jagathy Sreekumar as Kichamani
M. S. Thripunithura as Rajalakshmi's Father
Ponnamma Babu as Rajalakshmi's Mother
 Priyanka	as 	Rajamma
Risabava as Doctor
 Yadhukrishnan
 Franlee [Master role]

References

External links

1997 films
1990s Malayalam-language films
Films scored by Johnson